Héctor González Curiel (born 1968 in Tepic, Nayarit) is a Mexican engineer, politician and member of the Institutional Revolutionary Party.

Curiel entered politics in 1989 in the Department of Planning and Development, in charge of Nayarit's drinking water and sewage programme. For thirteen years, he served as head of SIAPA, Tepic.

Between 2011 and 2014, Curiel served as Municipal President of Tepic.

References 

Living people
1968 births
21st-century Mexican politicians
Mexican engineers
Institutional Revolutionary Party politicians
People from Tepic
Municipal presidents of Tepic